Round Midnight is an album by Elkie Brooks. Released on CD and cassette in 1993 through Castle Records, Round Midnight, reached number 24 and stayed in the UK Albums Chart for four weeks.

Track listing 
"All Night Long"
"What Kind Of Man Are You?"
"Since I Fell for You"
"Cry Me a River"
"Don't Explain"
"Just For a Thrill"
"'Round Midnight"
"Hard Times"
"Black Coffee"
"Travelling Light"
"Drinking Again"
"Here's That Rainy Day"
"Save Your Love For Me"
"Don't Smoke In Bed"
"Crazy He Calls Me"
"Spring Can Really Hang You Up the Most"

Personnel 
Elkie Brooks – vocals

References

1993 albums
Elkie Brooks albums